Pădina Mare is a commune located in Mehedinți County, Oltenia, Romania. It is composed of six villages: Biban, Iablanița, Olteanca, Pădina Mare, Pădina Mică and Slașoma.

References

Communes in Mehedinți County
Localities in Oltenia